Purabi Dutta was a Bengali female singer from Kolkata, West Bengal, India. She is considered as one of the greatest exponents and an authentic singer of Nazrul Geeti (the songs created by Kazi Nazrul Islam).

Early years
Purabi Dutta was daughter of Bibhuti Dutta, the famous classical vocal maestro. Her training was initiated at home. In 1946 she was a contestant in All India Music Competition organised by Chetla Murari Smriti Sangeet Sammilini where she won the silver trophy in vocal music.

Career
Purabi Dutta was undoubtedly one of the noted exponents of Nazrulgeeti (the songs composed by Kazi Nazrul Islam). In her early days she was associated with various programs of All India Radio, Kolkata. She recorded many songs throughout her music career, mostly the songs composed by Kazi Nazrul Islam, known as NAZRUL SANGEET or NAZRUL GEETI. She selflessly dedicated herself in teaching Nazrul Sangeet for her entire life. For many years Purabi Dutta was attached to "Bani Chakra" of Gariahat. She was also attached to Bengal Music College, where she was a teacher along with Hemanta Mukherjee, Chinmoy Chattopadhyay, Akhilbandhu Ghosh and others. She was very close to Pandit Jnanprakas Ghosh, Biman Mukhopadhyay, Manabendra Mukhpadhyay, Adhir Bagchi and other eminent artists and singers of Bengal.

During 1950s and '60s Purabi Dutta was associated with All India Radio and performed in various programs.

Purabi Dutta's albums in Nazrulgeeti became very popular. Some of the album titles are noted below:

1974 Songs of Kazi Nazrul - SAREGAMA
1975 Songs of Kazi Nazrul - SAREGAMA 
1980 Valentine Special - Bengali Romantic Nazrulgeeti
1982 Halud Gandar Phul
2014 Chharo Chharo Anchal
2014 Jhum Jhum Jhumra Nachte
2014 Shiuli Tolay Bhorbela - INRECO

Purabi Dutta appeared for stage performance in the Bangla Sangeet Mela in April, 2004, after keeping herself away for almost one and a half years from the spot light. She sang two songs: মনে পরে আজ সে কোন জনমে (Mone pore aaj se kon janame), followed by নিরন্ধ্র মেঘে মেঘে অন্ধ গগন (Nirandhra meghe andha gagan). Angshuman Bhowmik observed:

Death
Purabi Dutta died on Sunday, 1 December 2013, in her residence at Sonarpur (after she shifted from her Gariahat residence), far away from the music world she was acquainted with. In the obituary, Kolkata 24X7 news channel published the following:

Memoirs of the Life, Writings, & Correspondence

Pandit Jnanprakash Ghosh was involved in All India Radio for a long time, and during his tenure as producer in light music unit he produced very popular programs such as "Sangeetanjali", "Desh Bandana", "Ramya Geeti" and "E Maser Gaan" (Song of the month). He himself composed music in the lyrics by many poets, such as Bani Kumar, Nalinikanta Sarkar, Murari Mohan Sen, Dhirendra Narayan Roy, Shyamal Gupta, Gouriprasanna Majumdar, Prasun Mitra etc. In 1965 he composed tune for a song written by Bani Kumar: "ভারত নভের শুভ্র বীণায় কোন অমৃত ডাক দিলো রে". The song was sung by Gouri Mitra, Purabi Dutta, Subash Mitra, Diptiprakas Majumdar and Dhiren Basu. It was aired in the program "Desh Bandana".
While releasing her newest album on Nazrulgeeti on 19 September 2013 at Bengal Club, Kolkata, eminent singer Indrani Sen expressed her gratitude towards her gurus Shrimati Purabi Dutta and Shri Biman Mukhopadhay. This was the last known public appearance of Srimati Purabi Dutta.

Selected list of songs
List of Songs

References

2013 deaths
Bengali playback singers
Singers from Kolkata
Indian women playback singers
21st-century Indian women singers
20th-century Indian singers
Women musicians from West Bengal
Academic staff of the University of Calcutta
20th-century Indian women singers
21st-century Indian singers
1942 births